Hoseynabad-e Amini (also Romanized as Ḩoseynābād-e Amīnī, Hosein Abad Amini, and Ḩoseynābād Amīnī; also known as Ḩoseynābād, Husainābād, and Gusainabad) is a village in Dashtabi-ye Sharqi Rural District, Dashtabi District, Buin Zahra County, Qazvin Province, Iran. At the 2006 census, its population was 366, in 93 families.

References 

Populated places in Buin Zahra County